Pentamerista is a monotypic genus of flowering plants belonging to the family Tetrameristaceae. The only species is Pentamerista neotropica.

Its native range is Colombia to Venezuela and Northern Brazil.

References

Ericales
Monotypic Ericales genera